Catherine D. (Kitty) Kimball (born February 7, 1945) is the retired Chief Justice of the Louisiana Supreme Court. She was also the first woman elected to the Louisiana Supreme Court, in 1992. Before that, in 1983, she was the first female judge in the 18th Judicial District.

Biography
Kimball was born in Alexandria, Louisiana, and is married to Clyde W. Kimball, a former Louisiana state representative and deputy secretary of the Louisiana Department of Wildlife and Fisheries.  A graduate of Bolton High School in Alexandria, she received her J.D. from the Louisiana State University law school in 1970.  She is currently a resident of Ventress, Louisiana.

Kimball had a stroke on January 10, 2010 and underwent post-stroke rehabilitation therapy at the Neuromedical Rehabilitation Hospital in Baton Rouge until her release on February 19, 2010.

Legacy
In 2011, Justice Kimball was inducted into the Louisiana Political Museum and Hall of Fame in Winnfield.

See also
List of first women lawyers and judges in Maine
List of female state supreme court justices

References

External links
 "Catherine Kimball named Chief Justice of Louisiana Supreme Court" - Models For Change

1945 births
Living people
20th-century American women judges
20th-century American judges
21st-century American women judges
21st-century American judges
American women judges
Bolton High School (Louisiana) alumni
Catholics from Louisiana
Chief Justices of the Louisiana Supreme Court
Justices of the Louisiana Supreme Court
Louisiana Democrats
Louisiana Independents
Louisiana lawyers
Louisiana state court judges
Louisiana State University alumni
Louisiana State University Law Center alumni
People from New Roads, Louisiana
Politicians from Alexandria, Louisiana
Women chief justices of state supreme courts in the United States